Short Trips – Volume 3 is a Big Finish Productions audiobook based on the long-running British science fiction television series Doctor Who.

After the Big Finish Short Trips books ended the range was restarted in talking book format, now read by actors with music and sound effects.

Notes
Seven to One is split into eight parts and dispersed between the other stories.  It features the first seven Doctors arriving and disappearing from the same spot, one after the other and in reverse order.
The powerful, ancient, diametrically opposed, Black and White entities, locked in an eternal struggle, are never named.  Their description implies that they are the Black Guardian and the White Guardian.
Sophie Aldred reads her story in first person, as Ace.  India Fisher also reads her story in first person, but not as a previously established character.

External links 
Short Trips Volume 3

Big Finish Short Trips
Doctor Who spin-offs